Lucius Furius Medullinus (  474–473 BC) was a Roman politician in the 5th century BC, and consul in 474 BC.

Biography
In 474 BC, he was consul with Manlius Vulso. His colleague Manlius imposed a truce on Veii, which lasted 40 years. With the return of peace, the consuls proceeded with a census of the population, which was evaluated at 103,000 citizens.

In the following year, Furius and his colleague were brought to trial by the tribune Gnaeus Genucius for failing to appoint the decemvirs to allocate the public lands. However, on the day of the trial Genucius was found dead, and as a consequence the charges were dismissed.

References

Bibliography

Ancient bibliography
 Livy, Ab urbe condita
 Dionysius of Halicarnassus, Roman Antiquities
 Diodorus Siculus, Bibliotheca Historica

Modern bibliography
 

5th-century BC Roman consuls
Medullinus, Lucius